Friederike Thieme (born ) is a German female volleyball player. She was part of the Germany women's national volleyball team.

She participated in the 2012 FIVB Volleyball World Grand Prix.

References

External links
 Profile at FIVB.org

1987 births
Living people
German women's volleyball players
Place of birth missing (living people)